Haritz Mújika López (born 13 November 1981) is a Spanish former professional footballer who played mainly as a forward, currently manager of SD Amorebieta.

Playing career
Born in Pasaia, Gipuzkoa, Mújika spent 11 of his first 12 seasons as a senior in the Segunda División B, starting at SD Beasain then representing Real Sociedad's B team – he also played with them in Tercera División – Real Unión, Burgos CF, UE Castelldefels, Zamora CF and CD Mirandés. With the latter club, he was an undisputed starter in his early years, scoring seven goals in 37 matches in 2011–12 to help gain promotion to the Segunda División for the first time in its history.

Mújika made his debut in the competition at nearly 31 years of age, playing the full 90 minutes in a 0–1 home loss against SD Huesca on 17 August 2012. He scored his first goal as a professional on 13 January 2013, closing the 1–1 draw at Sporting de Gijón.

Mújika left Mirandés in August 2014, and signed for Real Unión in the third division. He moved to SD Amorebieta of the same league in 2017, retiring two years later at the age of 37.

Coaching career
Immediately after retiring, Mújika joined Iñigo Vélez's technical staff at his last club Amorebieta, as an assistant manager. On 8 March 2022, he was appointed at the helm of the team (newcomers to the second tier) after the latter's dismissal. On his debut, five days later, he lost 1–0 at SD Eibar.

Managerial statistics

References

External links
Mirandés official profile 

1981 births
Living people
People from Pasaia
Sportspeople from Gipuzkoa
Spanish footballers
Footballers from the Basque Country (autonomous community)
Association football forwards
Segunda División players
Segunda División B players
Tercera División players
Antiguoko players
SD Beasain footballers
Real Sociedad B footballers
Real Unión footballers
Burgos CF footballers
Zamora CF footballers
CD Mirandés footballers
SD Amorebieta footballers
Spanish football managers
Segunda División managers
Primera Federación managers
SD Amorebieta managers